George Bancroft (October 3, 1800 – January 17, 1891) was an American historian, statesman and Democratic politician who was prominent in promoting secondary education both in his home state of Massachusetts and at the national and international levels.

During his tenure as U.S. Secretary of the Navy, he established the United States Naval Academy at Annapolis. He was a senior American diplomat in Europe, leading diplomatic missions to Britain and Germany. Among his best-known writings is the magisterial series, History of the United States, from the Discovery of the American Continent.

Early life and education
Bancroft was born on October 3, 1800, in Worcester, Massachusetts.

His family had been in Massachusetts Bay since 1632. George's father, Aaron Bancroft, was distinguished as a revolutionary soldier, a leading Unitarian clergyman, and author of a popular biography of George Washington.

Education
Bancroft began his education at Phillips Exeter Academy.

He entered Harvard College at thirteen years of age and graduated with the Class of 1817.

After Harvard, Bancroft's father sent him abroad to study in Germany, where he studied at the universities of Göttingen, and Berlin. At Göttingen, he studied Plato with Arnold Hermann Ludwig Heeren, history with Heeren and Gottlieb Jakob Planck, and languages and scripture interpretation with Albert Eichhorn, natural science with Johann Friedrich Blumenbach, German literature with Georg Friedrich Benecke, French and Italian literature with Artaud and Bunsen, and classics with Georg Ludolf Dissen. In 1820, he received his doctorate from the University of Göttingen.

Bancroft capped off his education with a European tour, in the course of which he sought out almost every distinguished man in the European world of letters, science and art, including Johann Wolfgang von Goethe, Wilhelm von Humboldt, Friedrich Daniel Ernst Schleiermacher, Georg Wilhelm Friedrich Hegel, Lord Byron, Barthold Georg Niebuhr, Christian Charles Josias Bunsen, Friedrich Carl von Savigny, Varnhagen von Ense, Victor Cousin, Benjamin Constant and Alessandro Manzoni.

Early career
Bancroft returned to the United States in 1822. While the young man delivered several sermons at his father's behest shortly after his return, his love of literature proved a stronger attachment.

His first position was as a tutor of Greek at Harvard. Bancroft chafed at the narrow curriculum of Harvard in his day and the pedantic spirit of its classics curriculum. Moreover, his personal affect of ardent Romanticism subjected him to ridicule among the formal society of New England and his political sympathies for Jacksonian democracy put him at odds with nearly all of the Boston elite.

Round Hill School
In 1823, he published his first work, a little volume of poetry, translations and original pieces, which brought no fame. Bancroft finally left Cambridge and with Joseph Cogswell established the Round Hill School at Northampton, Massachusetts.

While at Round Hill, Bancroft contributed frequently to the North American Review and American Quarterly. He also made a translation of Arnold Hermann Ludwig Heeren's work on The Politics of Ancient Greece.  In 1836, he published an oration advocating universal suffrage and the foundation of the state on the power of the whole people.

State politics
In 1830, he was elected to the Massachusetts State Senate from Northampton without his knowledge by the support of the Working Men's Party, but refused to take his seat. and the next year he declined another nomination, though certain to have been elected, for the state senate.

Historian
Bancroft, having trained in the leading German universities, was an accomplished scholar, whose masterwork History of the United States, from the Discovery of the American Continent covered the new nation in depth down to 1789. His History of the United States started appearing in 1834, and he constantly revised it in numerous editions. It remains among the most comprehensive histories of colonial America.

Themes
Bancroft was a Romantic, emphasizing nationalist and republican values. Bancroft played on four recurring themes to explain the development of American values: providence, progress, patria, and pan-democracy. "Providence" meant that destiny depended more on God than on human will. The idea of "progress" indicated that through continuous reform a better society was possible. Patria was deserved because America's spreading influence would bring liberty and freedom to more and more of the world. "Pan-democracy" meant the nation-state was central to the drama, not specific heroes or villains.

Richard C. Vitzthum argues that Bancroft's histories exemplify his Unitarian moral vision of faith in progress. The history of America, in Bancroft's view, exemplified the gradual unfolding of God's purpose for mankind – the development of religious and political liberty.

George M. Frederickson argues that Bancroft's "universalist theory of national origins... made the American Revolution not only the fruit of a specific historical tradition, but also a creed of liberty for all mankind."

Historiographical reception and legacy
Bancroft's orotund romantic style and enthusiastic patriotism fell out of favor with later generations of scientific historians, who did not assign his books to students. After 1890, American scholars of the Imperial School took a more favorable view of the British Empire than Bancroft.

Edmund Morgan compares Bancroft's history to that of the Liberal statesman Sir George Trevelyan in that both reject the Progressive view of the Revolution as a mere invocation of political philosophy as a means to keep and consolidate power. Morgan and other neo-Whig historians have embraced Bancroft's view that the patriots were motivated by a deep commitment to individual liberty.

Inspired by Bancroft, Bernard Bailyn and a cohort of mid-twentieth-century historians challenged the dichotomy between "national self-awareness" and the study of history. Although they had found "limitations" in Bancroft's works, mid-twentieth-century "instrumentalist" historians wished to reexamine the "image of colonial origins" of the American Revolution. By 1956, this subset of scholars had tentatively determined that, "toward the end of the seventeenth century there emerged an entire apparatus of local politics" that "came, gradually, to accommodate itself" within the imperial system and in various "forms...it is their collapse under the pressures of new circumstances after 1760 that alone made the Revolution
'irrepressible.' "

Political and diplomatic career

Collector of Boston
In 1837, Bancroft entered active politics by accepting an appointment as Collector of Customs of the Port of Boston by President Martin Van Buren. Two of his own appointees in the office were Orestes Brownson and author Nathaniel Hawthorne.

In 1844, Bancroft was the Democratic candidate for governor of Massachusetts but he was defeated. He called for the annexation of Texas as extending "the area of freedom" and opposed slavery.

Secretary of the Navy
In 1845, in recognition for his support at the previous Democratic convention, Bancroft was appointed to James Polk's cabinet as Secretary of the Navy, serving until 1846, when, for a month, he was acting Secretary of War.

During his short period in the cabinet, Bancroft established the United States Naval Academy at Annapolis, creating a legacy of education and leadership. He ordered naval action that resulted in the occupation of California and, as secretary of War, sent Zachary Taylor into the contested land between Texas and Mexico. That catalyzed the Mexican War, resulting in the United States greatly increasing its territory in the Southwest.

Bancroft designed and developed the Naval Academy; he received all the appropriations for which he asked. Congress had never been willing to establish a naval academy, but Bancroft studied the law to assess the powers of the Secretary of the Navy. He found that he could order "a place where midshipmen should wait for orders." He could also direct instructors to give lessons to them at sea, and by law, instructors could follow the midshipmen to the place of their common residence on shore. The appropriation of the year for the naval service met the expense, and the Secretary of War ceded an abandoned military post to the navy.

Therefore, when Congress came together, it learned that the midshipmen not at sea were housed at Annapolis. Thus, they were protected from the dangers of idleness and city life and busy at a regular course of study. Congress accepted the school, which was in full operation, and granted money for the repairs of the buildings.

Bancroft introduced some new respected professors into the corps of instructors, and he suggested a system of promotion, related to experience and achievements as well as age. The merit system was not fully developed or applied at the time. Bancroft was influential also in obtaining additional appropriations for the United States Naval Observatory.

Minister to the United Kingdom
Similarly, Bancroft studied so deeply the Oregon boundary dispute that in 1846, he was sent as minister plenipotentiary to London to work with the British government on the issue. There, he roomed with the historian Macaulay and the poet Hallam. With the election of Whig Zachary Taylor as president, Bancroft's political appointment ended. On his return to the United States in 1849, he withdrew from public life and moved to New York, where he focused on writing history.

Return to private life

As a private citizen, Bancroft initially expressed skepticism towards Abraham Lincoln's election, describing him as, "without brains," and "ignorant, self-willed, and... surrounded by men some of whom are almost as ignorant as himself." However, Bancroft softened to the wartime president after initiating correspondence with Lincoln in 1861, and used the communication to argue for the case of abolishing slavery. In April 1864, at Bancroft's request, President Abraham Lincoln wrote out what would become the fourth of five known manuscripts of the Gettysburg Address. Bancroft planned to include the copy in Autograph Leaves of Our Country's Authors, which he planned to sell at a Soldiers' and Sailors' Sanitary Fair, in Baltimore, to raise money to care for the Union Army.

In 1866, he was chosen by Congress to deliver the special eulogy on Lincoln.

Minister to Prussia and Germany
In 1867, President Andrew Johnson offered Bancroft the post of US minister to Prussia, enabling him to return to Germany. Bancroft remained in Berlin for seven years, throughout the Franco-Prussian War and German unification.

President Ulysses S. Grant appointed him minister to the German Empire in 1871. During his tenure in Berlin, Bancroft spent much time negotiating agreements with Prussia and the other north German states relating to naturalization and citizenship issues; they became known as the Bancroft Treaties in his honor. The treaties were the first international recognition of the right of expatriation. The principle has since incorporated in the law of nations.

San Juan Islands (now Washington State) arbitration
His last official achievements are considered the greatest.  The United States maintained that the disputed channel was intended to be the Haro Strait, while Great Britain believed that the Rosario State (Pig War (1859)). In the San Juan arbitration Bancroft displayed great versatility and skill and won the case, which was decided by a commission (three eminent German Judges) appointed by the German Emperor, Kaiser Wilhelm.  The final ruling was issued on October 21, 1872 and British troops withdrew from San Juan Island on November 22, 1872. After 26 years of maintaining an amicable, yet tense relationship.

Personal life

Family
His first wife was Sarah Dwight, of a rich family in Springfield, Massachusetts; they married in 1827 and had two sons. She died in 1837.  He formed a second marriage with Mrs Elizabeth Davis Bliss, a widow with two children. Together they had a daughter.

In his later years Bancroft lived in Washington, DC, summering at Rose Cliff, Newport, Rhode Island, the site where Rosecliff was later built.

Organizations
Bancroft was elected a member of the American Antiquarian Society in 1838, and also served as its Secretary of Domestic Correspondence from 1877 to 1880.

In 1841, Bancroft was elected as a member of the American Philosophical Society.

In New York, Bancroft was a founding member of the American Geographical Society and served as the society's first president for nearly three years (February 21, 1852 – December 7, 1854).

Bancroft was elected an Associate Fellow of the American Academy of Arts and Sciences in 1863.

Death
Bancroft died in 1891, in Washington, D.C. He was the last surviving member of the Polk cabinet.

Works

Major works 
Bancroft, George. History of the United States of America, from the Discovery of the American Continent. (Boston: Little, Brown, and company, numerous editions in 8 or 10 volumes 1854–1878).
  Bancroft, George; Dyer, Oliver, 1824–1907. (1891) History of the Battle of Lake Erie, and Miscellaneous Papers (New York: R. Bonner's sons) 292 pp. (American Library Association) online edition
 Bancroft, George. Martin Van Buren to the End of His Public Career. New York: Harper & Brothers, 1889. online edition
Bancroft, George. History of the Formation of the Constitution of the United States of America.(New York, D. Appleton and Company, 1882, Vol 1) online edition

Minor publications 
An Oration Delivered on July 4, 1826, at Northampton, Mass. (Northampton, 1826)
History of the Political System of Europe, translated from Heeren (1829)
An Oration delivered before the Democracy of Springfield and Neighboring Towns, July 4, 1836 (2d ed., with prefatory remarks, Springfield, 1836)
History of the Colonization of the United States (Boston, 1841, 12mo, abridged)
An Oration delivered at the Commemoration, in Washington, of the Death of Andrew Jackson, June 27, 1845
 The Necessity, the Reality, and the Promise of the Progress of the Human Race
 An Oration delivered before the New York Historical Society, November 20, 1854 (New York, 1854)
Proceedings of the First Assembly of Virginia, 1619; Communicated, with an Introductory Note, by George Bancroft
Collections of the New York Historical Society, second series, vol. iii., part i. (New York, 1857)
Literary and Historical Miscellanies (New York, 1855)
Memorial Address on the Life and Character of Abraham Lincoln, delivered at the request of both Houses of the Congress of America, before them, in the House of Representatives at Washington, on February 12, 1866 (Washington, 1866) via Archive.org
A Plea for the Constitution of the United States of America, Wounded in the House of its Guardians
Veritati Unice Litarem (New York, 1886)

Among his other speeches and addresses may be mentioned a lecture on "The Culture, the Support, and the Object of Art in a Republic," in the course of the New York Historical Society in 1852; and one on "The Office, Appropriate Culture, and Duty of the Mechanic."

Bancroft contributed a biography of Jonathan Edwards to the American Cyclopædia.

Namesakes and monuments

The United States Navy has named several ships USS Bancroft for him, as well as the fleet ballistic missile submarine USS George Bancroft (SSBN-643), the mid-19th century United States Coast Survey schooner USCS Bancroft and steel gunboat 

The dormitory at the United States Naval Academy, Bancroft Hall, is named after him. It is the largest single dormitory in the world.

Bancroft is one of 23 famous names on the $1 educational currency note of 1896.

The name of Bancroft, honoring George Bancroft, is found atop one of several marble pillars in the Thomas Jefferson Building of the United States Library of Congress in Washington, DC.

In and around his birthplace of Worcester, Massachusetts, many streets, businesses and monuments bear his name:
 Bancroft School, Worcester, MA
 Bancroft Hall at Phillips Exeter Academy, Exeter, New Hampshire.
 Bancroft Tower, erected in his honor in Salisbury Park, Worcester, MA
 Bancroft Commons, an apartment building in downtown Worcester, MA
 Bancroft Motors, now owned by HARR Motor Company
 Bancroft Street, Gardner, MA
 Bancroft Street, Worcester, MA
 Bancroft Elementary School, (in the Bancroft neighborhood of the City of) Minneapolis, MN
 Bancroft Elementary School, (in the Mount Pleasant neighborhood of) Washington, D.C.
 Bancroft Elementary School, Scranton, Pennsylvania
 Bancroft's Talon, an item in the 2014 MOBA Smite
 Bancroft, Iowa
 Bancroft, Maine
 Bancroft, Michigan

Bancroft is interred at Rural Cemetery in Worcester.

Notes

References
 
 
 Dawes, N. H., and F. T. Nichols. "Revaluing George Bancroft," New England Quarterly, 6#2 (1933), pp. 278–293 in JSTOR
 Kraus, Michael. "George Bancroft 1834–1934," New England Quarterly, 7#4 (1934), pp. 662–686 in JSTOR
Handlin, Lillian. George Bancroft: The Intellectual as Democrat. (New York, 1984).
Nye, Russel B. George Bancroft, Brahmin Rebel (New York, 1944).
 Stewart, Watt. "George Bancroft Historian of the American Republic," Mississippi Valley Historical Review, 19#1 (1932), pp. 77–86 in JSTOR
Wish, Harvey. The American Historian: A Social-intellectual History of the Writing of the American Past (1960) ch 5 on Bancroft online
Marquis Who's Who, Inc. Who Was Who in American History, the Military. Chicago: Marquis Who's Who, 1975.

Primary sources
Howe, M. A. Dewolfe The Life and Letters of George Bancroft – Vol. 1 (1971 reprint)
Cornell University, Guide to the George Bancroft papers

External links

 

George Bancroft Papers, 1823–1890 Manuscripts and Archives, New York Public Library
Obituary at New York Times site
 
 
 
 

1800 births
1891 deaths
Ambassadors of the United States to the United Kingdom
Ambassadors of the United States to Prussia
19th-century American diplomats
19th-century American historians
19th-century American male writers
Harvard College alumni
Historians of the United States
Politicians from Worcester, Massachusetts
Writers from Washington, D.C.
Phillips Exeter Academy alumni
Presidents of the American Historical Association
Members of the American Antiquarian Society
United States Naval Academy
American people of English descent
United States Secretaries of the Navy
Heidelberg University alumni
Polk administration cabinet members
Fellows of the American Academy of Arts and Sciences
Recipients of the Pour le Mérite (civil class)
University of Göttingen alumni
Hall of Fame for Great Americans inductees
Gardiner family
Writers from Springfield, Massachusetts
Burials at Rural Cemetery (Worcester, Massachusetts)
Collectors of the Port of Boston
Writers from Worcester, Massachusetts
19th-century American politicians
American expatriates in Germany
Historians from Massachusetts
American Geographical Society
American male non-fiction writers
Members of the Göttingen Academy of Sciences and Humanities